Events in the year 1884 in India.

Incumbents
 Empress of India – Queen Victoria
 Viceroy of India – George Robinson, 1st Marquess of Ripon
 Viceroy of India – The Earl of Dufferin (from 13 December)

Events
 National income - 4,056 million

Law
Explosives Act
Colonial Prisoners Removal Act (British statute)
Naval Discipline Act (British statute)
Criminal Lunatics Act (British statute)
Indian Marine Service Act (British statute)

Births
 27 July - Sardar Bahadur Maharaj Jagat Singh Ji, Third Satguru of Radha Soami Satsang Beas (died 23 October 1951)
 March – Jagadguru Swami Sri Bharati Krishna Tirthaji Maharaja, Hindu teacher (d.1960).
 7 November – Pandurang Sadashiv Khankhoje, revolutionary, scholar, agricultural scientist and historian (d.1967).
 22 November – Syed Sulaiman Nadvi, historian, biographer, littérateur and scholar of Islam (d.1953).

Deaths
 12 December – Charles Phillip Brown, writer and colonial official (b.1798).

 
India
Years of the 19th century in India